Caucasotachea is a genus of medium-sized air-breathing land snails, terrestrial pulmonate gastropod molluscs in the family Helicidae.

Species
The following species are currently classified in the genus:
 † Caucasotachea andrussovi Steklov, 1966 
 Caucasotachea atrolabiata (Krynicki, 1833)
 † Caucasotachea beringi Schütt, 1985 
 Caucasotachea calligera (Dubois de Montpéreux, 1840)
 † Caucasotachea candirensis Schütt, 1985 
 Caucasotachea intercedens (Retowski, 1889)
 † Caucasotachea kubanica Steklov, 1966 
 Caucasotachea leucoranea (Mousson, 1863)
 † Caucasotachea phrygomysica (Oppenheim, 1919) 
 Caucasotachea vindobonensis'' (C. Pfeiffer, 1828)

References

Helicidae
Gastropod genera